Allison Rabour (born 2 March 1967) is a former Italian female long-distance runner who competed at individual senior level at the IAAF World Women's Road Race Championships and at the IAAF World Cross Country Championships (1989, 1991).

She was 5th at the 1989 Summer Universiade – Women's 10,000 metres.

National titles
She won a national championships at individual senior level.
Italian Athletics Championships
Half marathon: 1989

References

External links
 

1967 births
Living people
Italian female long-distance runners
Italian female cross country runners
Athletes from Rome